Paying Guests is a 1929 comedy novel by the British writer E.F. Benson, best known as the author of the Mapp and Lucia series. The story takes place at Wentworth, a boarding house in the fictional resort town of Bolton Spa. It focuses on the eccentric collection of summer residents, mostly there to try and recover their health, overseen by the domineering former Indian Army Colonel Chase. It has been described as "The coming together of character and situation in Paying Guests creates a comic masterpiece, worthy to stand alongside the Mapp and Lucia books".

Television adaptation
In 1986 it was a two-part adaptation was made as part of the BBC's Screenplay anthology series, with a cast featuring Robert Hardy, Angela Thorne and Richard O'Callaghan.

References

Bibliography
 Masters, Brian. The Life of E.F. Benson. Chatto & Windus, 1991.
 Palmer, Geoffrey & Lloyd, Noel. E.F. Benson - As He Was. Lennard, 1988.
 Reilly, John M. Twentieth Century Crime & Mystery Writers. Springer, 2015.
 Stringer, Jenny & Sutherland, John. The Oxford Companion to Twentieth-century Literature in English. Oxford University Press, 1996.

1929 British novels
British comedy novels
Novels set in England
Novels by E. F. Benson
Hutchinson (publisher) books